Hemkund Sahib (also spelled Hemkunt), formally known as Gurudwara Shri Hemkund Sahib Ji, is a Sikh place of worship and pilgrimage site in Chamoli district, Uttarakhand, India. It is devoted to Guru Gobind Singh (1666–1708), the tenth Sikh Guru, and finds mention in Dasam Granth. It is approached from Govindghat on the Rishikesh-Badrinath highway. The main town near Gobindghat is Joshimath. The elevation of the lake at Hemkund is approximately 13,650 feet.

Etymology
Hemkund is a Sanskrit name derived from Hem ("Snow") and Kund ("bowl"). Dasam Granth says this is the place where Pandu Raja practiced Yoga. In addition, the Dasam Granth says that in a former life, Guru Gobind Singh meditated intensely at Hemkund on Akaal

Travel
Hemkund is inaccessible from October through April because of snowbound paths and glaciers. Sikh pilgrims arrive in May and set to work to repair the damage to the path over the winter, which tradition is called kar seva ("selfless service"), a concept which forms an important tenet of the Sikh faith.

The  trek is along a reasonably well-maintained path to the village of Ghangaria (also called Govinddham). This path can be covered either by walk or by pony and a Gurudwara here gives shelter to pilgrims. In addition, there are a few hotels and a campground with tents and mattresses. Overnight stay is not allowed at Hemkund Sahib, so it is necessary to leave by 2 PM to make it back to Govindghat by dusk.

From Delhi, tourists take the train to Haridwar and then travel by bus to Govindghat via Rishikesh. Recently, an Indian airline company has started a helicopter service between Govindghat and Ghangria. The flight takes about 5 minutes. 

A recent study examining altitude sickness at Hemkund Sahib found that almost one-third of pilgrims who traveled to Hemkund suffered from Acute Mountain Sickness (a form of altitude sickness). As approximately 150,000 pilgrims are believed to travel to Hemkund Sahib each trekking season, almost 50,000 people are at risk of developing Acute Mountain Sickness each year. The authors stated the difficult nature of the trek, limited water consumption, and lack of awareness regarding altitude sickness as the main contributory factors.

Present Gurudwara
Design and construction of the present gurudwara at Hemkund was started in the mid-1960s, after Major General Harkirat Singh, KCIO, Engineer-in-Chief, Indian Army visited the gurudwara. The engineering brain behind the gurudwara project, Major General Harkirat Singh selected Architect Manmohan Singh Siali of the Military Engineering Services (MES) to head the design and construction effort. Thereafter, Architect Siali made annual trips to Hemkund Sahib and organized and supervised complex construction.  M/s Sahib Singh, Harbhajan Singh & Gursharan Singh were the dedicated Gursikh contractors who worked on the construction, overcoming numerous weather, altitude, terrain, and logistic challenges.  The unique design and construction are acclaimed as marvels, both of which have borne the test of sustainability over the past many decades.

Valley of Flowers

The Indian Government has declared this valley a national park. It is situated in Nanda Devi Bio Reserve, and all activities are carefully regulated to preserve the valley in pristine condition. The best months to visit are July and August, during the monsoons. Legend has it that a flower called Brahma-Kamal blossoms here every 12 years. The trek to the valley is for advanced trekkers, especially during an extended period of rainfall. Almost every single rock on the path to the valley of flowers is wobbly and requires significant level of concentration to avoid an unnecessary injury. It is a popular second destination for pilgrims visiting Hemkunt Sahib and definitely worth spending a day.

Gallery

References

Further reading
 Gurdwara in the Himalayas: Sri Hemkunt Sahib, by Suparna Rajguru, M. S. Siali. Published by Hemkunt, 2001. .
 Pilgrimage to Hemkunt, by Jaswant Singh Neki. Photographs by Sondeep Shankar. New Delhi, UBSPD, 2002, .

External links

 Hemkund Sahib Yatra Information
 HemKund Sahib Road Map
 
 Facebook Page

Sikh places
Religious tourism in India
Tourism in Uttarakhand
Gurdwaras in Uttarakhand
Chamoli district